Dougherty County is located in the southwestern portion of the U.S. state of Georgia. As of the 2020 census, the population was 85,790. The county seat and sole incorporated city is Albany.

Dougherty County is included in the Albany, GA Metropolitan Statistical Area. Historically dominated by cotton plantation agriculture in the nineteenth century, it is part of the Black Belt of the South.

History
The county was created by the Georgia General Assembly on December 15, 1853, from a part of Baker County. It was named after Charles Dougherty, a respected judge and lawyer from Athens, Georgia. In 1854 and 1856 small areas were added from Worth County.

As noted above, the county was developed by European Americans using enslaved African Americans as workers for the production of cotton as a commodity crop. Its county seat of Albany, Georgia is located on the Flint River, which was originally the chief means of transportation for shipped products. Albany was later served by seven railroad lines, adding to its significance as a market center. The city was a center of the Civil Rights Movement, particularly during the early 1960s.

Geography

The majority of Dougherty County is located in the Lower Flint River sub-basin of the ACF River Basin (Apalachicola-Chattahoochee-Flint River Basin). The northeastern corner of the county, northeast of Albany, is located in the Middle Flint River sub-basin of the same ACF River basin. A very small portion of Dougherty County, north of Albany, is located in the Kinchafoonee-Muckalee sub-basin of the larger ACF River Basin. The remaining western portion of the county is located in the Ichawaynochaway Creek sub-basin of the same ACF River Basin.

Major highways

  U.S. Route 19
  U.S. Route 19 Business
  U.S. Route 82
  U.S. Route 82 Business
  State Route 3
  State Route 62
  State Route 91
  State Route 133
  State Route 234
  State Route 300
  State Route 520
  State Route 520 Business

Adjacent counties
 Lee County – north
 Worth County – east
 Mitchell County – south
 Baker County – southwest
 Calhoun County – west
 Terrell County – northwest

Demographics

2020 census

As of the 2020 United States census, there were 85,790 people, 32,630 households, and 18,213 families residing in the county.

2010 census
As of the 2010 United States Census, there were 94,565 people, 36,508 households, and 23,422 families living in the county. The racial makeup of the county was 67.1% black or African American, 29.6% white, 0.8% Asian, 0.2% American Indian, 0.1% Pacific islander, 1.0% from other races, and 1.2% from two or more races. Those of Hispanic or Latino origin made up 2.2% of the population. In terms of ancestry, 6.1% were English, 6.0% were American, and 5.3% were Irish.

Of the 36,508 households, 34.3% had children under the age of 18 living with them, 33.7% were married couples living together, 25.6% had a female householder with no husband present, 35.8% were non-families, and 30.2% of all households were made up of individuals. The average household size was 2.47 and the average family size was 3.08. The median age was 33.2 years.

The median income for a household in the county was $32,435 and the median income for a family was $39,951. Males had a median income of $34,444 versus $27,848 for females. The per capita income for the county was $19,210. About 22.7% of families and 28.9% of the population were below the poverty line, including 42.7% of those under age 18 and 15.5% of those age 65 or over.

2000 census
As of the 2000 census of 2000, there were 96,065 people, 35,552 households, and 24,282 families living in the county. There were 39,656 housing units at an average density of 120 per square mile (46/km2). The racial makeup of the county was 60.13% Black or African American, 37.80% White, 0.23% Native American, 0.57% Asian, 0.03% Pacific Islander, 0.49% from other races, and 0.74% from two or more races.  1.34% of the population were Hispanic or Latino of any race.

The largest European ancestry groups in Dougherty County are English (6.6%), Irish (6.5%), "American" (mostly English and Scots-Irish)(5.6%), German (4.5%) and Scots-Irish (1.6%).

There were 35,552 households, out of which 32.90% had children under the age of 18 living with them, 40.90% were married couples living together, 23.20% had a female householder with no husband present, and 31.70% were non-families. 26.80% of all households were made up of individuals, and 8.90% had someone living alone who was 65 years of age or older.  The average household size was 2.58 and the average family size was 3.13.

In the county, the population was spread out, with 27.70% under the age of 18, 12.20% from 18 to 24, 27.60% from 25 to 44, 20.90% from 45 to 64, and 11.70% who were 65 years of age or older.  The median age was 32 years. For every 100 females, there were 87.40 males.  For every 100 females age 18 and over, there were 82.30 males.

The median income for a household in the county was $30,934, and the median income for a family was $36,655. Males had a median income of $30,742 versus $22,254 for females. The per capita income for the county was $16,645.  About 19.60% of families and 24.80% of the population were below the poverty line, including 35.30% of those under age 18 and 17.20% of those age 65 or over.

Education

Communities

City
 Albany

Census-designated place
 Putney

Unincorporated communities
 Acree
 Doublegate
 Pecan City
 Pretoria
 Radium Springs

Politics

See also

 National Register of Historic Places listings in Dougherty County, Georgia
List of counties in Georgia
 W.E.B. Du Bois, The Souls of Black Folk (1903) contains two essays that are surveys of race relations in Dougherty County from Reconstruction to the end of the 19th century.
 "Of the Black Belt"
 "Of the Quest of the Golden Fleece"

References

External links
 Dougherty County official website

 Official Downtown Albany website
 New Georgia Encyclopedia
 Georgia Place Names
 Dougherty County Courthouse history
 Dougherty County historical marker

 
Georgia (U.S. state) counties
1853 establishments in Georgia (U.S. state)
Albany metropolitan area, Georgia
Populated places established in 1853
Black Belt (U.S. region)
Majority-minority counties in Georgia